Vicars is an unincorporated community in Roane County, in the U.S. state of West Virginia.

History
A post office called Vicars was in operation between 1904 and 1972. W. L. Vicars, an early postmaster, gave the community his name.

References

Unincorporated communities in Roane County, West Virginia
Unincorporated communities in West Virginia